Galip Cav (3 November 1912 – 1950) was a Turkish cyclist. He competed in the team pursuit and time trial events at the 1928 Summer Olympics.

References

External links
 

1912 births
1950 deaths
Turkish male cyclists
Fenerbahçe cyclists
Olympic cyclists of Turkey
Cyclists at the 1928 Summer Olympics
Sportspeople from Istanbul
20th-century Turkish people